Birdum is a locality in the Northern Territory of Australia located about  south of the territory capital of Darwin.

History

Railway

Birdum was the terminus of the North Australia Railway from 1929 until the outbreak of World War II. 

While the town remains very much unheard of, even amongst Territorians, it features on an unusually high proportion of vintage 20th century world globes, thanks to the position it once held at the end of the line.

From World War II onwards trains terminated at Larrimah, nine kilometres to the north, and Birdum lost not only its position of importance but also its pub, which was uprooted and shifted to Larrimah as a result.

Much of the railway infrastructure remained in place until the line closed in 1976.

World War II

After the bombing of Darwin during World War II, the Darwin civilian population was evacuated and the evacuees were transported by rail to Birdum siding where they were transferred to an army convoy to take them to Alice Springs.

An evacuation hospital was constructed at Birdum by the United States Army 135th Medical Regiment in September 1942.

The Royal Australian Air Force constructed a Base Personnel Staff Officer (BPSO) and Telecommunications Camp near Birdum.

No. 11 Signals Unit RAAF, which was part of No. 55 Operational Base Unit (OBU) was based at Birdum. The unit would be on aircraft listening watch and have to listen for a word which would indicate the air raid against enemy forces or bases had been successful or not. The equipment used was Kingsley AR7 receivers.

Heritage places
The following places listed on the Northern Territory Heritage Register are located within Birdum:
Wimmera Home
Frew Ponds Overland Telegraph Poles

References

Notes

Citations

Further reading
 Harvey, J The Never-Never Line Hyland House 1987,

External links

 
 Friends of the North Australia Railway
 Around the World in a Morris Minor. Pictures, made by Kerry Whitfield in 2004.
 Military Units based at Birdum during WW2.
 The Wireless Telegraph Station at Birdum during WW2. Retrieved 4 May 2010.

Towns in the Northern Territory
Abandoned settlements in the Northern Territory